Siphonaria diemenensis, is a species of air-breathing sea snail or false limpet, a marine pulmonate gastropod mollusc in the family Siphonariidae, the false limpets.

Description
The length of the shell attains 23.1 mm.

Distribution
This marine species occurs off Tasmania.

References

External links
 Quoy, J. R. C. & Gaimard, J. P. (1832-1835). Voyage de la corvette l'Astrolabe : exécuté par ordre du roi, pendant les années 1826-1827-1828-1829, sous le commandement de M. J. Dumont d'Urville. Zoologie. 
 Dayrat, B.; Goulding, T. C.; White, T. R. (2014). Diversity of Indo-West Pacific Siphonaria (Mollusca: Gastropoda: Euthyneura). Zootaxa. 3779(2): 246-276

Siphonariidae
Gastropods described in 1833